Naren Sonowal (born 10 February 1960 in Dighola Pather, Naharkatia)  is an Asom Gana Parishad politician from Assam. He is 5th Standard Pass. He has been elected in Assam Legislative Assembly election in 2016 from Naharkatia.

References 

1960 births
Living people
Asom Gana Parishad politicians
Assam MLAs 2016–2021
People from Dibrugarh district